Dennis Westcott (2 July 1917 – 13 July 1960) was an English footballer, who played for New Brighton, Wolverhampton Wanderers, Blackburn Rovers, Manchester City and Chesterfield as a centre forward.

He was posthumously inducted into the Wolverhampton Wanderers Hall of Fame in 2017.

Career 
Westcott started his career at local clubs Wallasey Grocers and Leasowe Road Brickworks, before failing trials with Football League clubs Everton and West Ham United. He then joined nearby New Brighton of the Third Division (North) in January 1936 and scored 10 goals in 18 league matches. Wolverhampton Wanderers signed him in July 1936 and gave him a debut against Grimsby in an FA Cup tie. Westcott scored one of the goals as Wolves won 6–2. He scored 22 goals during the 1937–38 season, making him the club's top scorer. The following season, he scored 43 goals in 43 appearances, setting a club record which stood for 50 years until it was broken by Steve Bull. Westcott played in the 1939 FA Cup Final, but Wolves were beaten 4–1 by Portsmouth.

In 1939 competitive football was then suspended due to World War II, depriving Westcott of several years in his prime. During the war he played four wartime internationals for England and scored six goals in five games while guesting with Brentford. When competitive football resumed in 1946, Westcott continued his goalscoring exploits, setting another club record with 38 goals in the 1946–47 season which made him top-scorer in the league. He scored on his only appearance for the Football League XI in March 1947. In 1948 he was released by Wolves and signed for Blackburn Rovers during the month prior to the club's relegation to the Second Division. At Blackburn he scored 37 goals in 63 league appearances. He then signed for Manchester City, where he scored 36 goals in 72 league appearances, finishing as the club's top scorer in each of the two full seasons he played. He then moved to Chesterfield and finished his career with Stafford Rangers.

In 1946, Westcott became one of the first football players to be injected with slices of monkey testicle, a bizarre doping programme instigated by manager Major Frank Buckley.

Personal life 
He died from leukaemia in 1960 at the age of 43, one week and four days after his 43rd birthday.

Honours 
Wolverhampton Wanderers
 Football League War Cup: 1941–42
Manchester City
 Football League Second Division runner-up: 1950–51

References

1917 births
1960 deaths
English footballers
England wartime international footballers
English Football League players
First Division/Premier League top scorers
Blackburn Rovers F.C. players
Chesterfield F.C. players
Manchester City F.C. players
New Brighton A.F.C. players
Wolverhampton Wanderers F.C. players
Stafford Rangers F.C. players
Watford F.C. wartime guest players
English Football League representative players
Brentford F.C. wartime guest players
Liverpool F.C. wartime guest players
Deaths from leukemia
Association football forwards
FA Cup Final players
Deaths from cancer in England